is the fourth studio album by the Japanese girl band Princess Princess, released on November 17, 1989, by CBS Sony. While no singles were generated by the album, "Papa" was included as the B-side of the band's third No. 1 single "Oh Yeah!".

The album became the band's first to hit No. 1 on Oricon's albums chart. It was also certified as a Million seller and Quadruple Platinum by the RIAJ.

Track listing 
All music is composed by Kaori Okui, except where indicated; all music is arranged by Princess Princess.

Charts

Certification

References

External links
 
 
 

Princess Princess (band) albums
1989 albums
Sony Music Entertainment Japan albums
Japanese-language albums